Netechma jelskii is a species of moth of the family Tortricidae. It is found in Cotopaxi Province, Ecuador.

The wingspan is 15 mm. The ground colour of the forewings consists of a triangular white blotch before the mid-dorsum and a cream sprinkled brown basal area. The remaining area is brown. The hindwings are greyish brown, but whiter basally.

Etymology
The species is named in honour of biologist Dr. Konstanty Jelski.

References

Moths described in 2008
Netechma